Maza is a Lolo-Burmese language spoken by the Yi people of China.

Maza is spoken by about 50 people in the village of Mengmei 孟梅, Puyang Village 普阳村, Muyang Township 木央乡, Funing County, Yunnan. Maza has a Qabiao substratum, since the area was originally inhabited by Qabiao speakers (Hsiu 2014:68-69). Maza displays circumfixal negation, a syntactic feature that is usually typical of Kra languages.

References

Mondzish languages
Languages of China